Alejandro Peña Esclusa (born 3 July 1954) is a Venezuelan politician, leader of the Venezuelan NGO Fuerza Solidaria and president of the NGO UnoAmérica. A former member of the LaRouche movement, in the 1980s he co-founded the Partido Laboral Venezolano (PLV, Venezuelan Labor Party) as the Venezuelan branch of LaRouche's International Caucus of Labor Committees. He has twice run for the Presidency, was a columnist for the newspapers Últimas Noticias and Diario de Caracas, and has been a correspondent for Argentina's La Nueva Provincia. He has campaigned against the São Paulo Forum since the mid-1990s, and in 2008 set up UnoAmérica as its "ideological antithesis". He has opposed Venezuelan President Hugo Chávez since the mid-1990s. In 2010 Peña Esclusa was arrested after the Salvadoran Francisco Chávez Abarca was arrested in Venezuela. Opposition groups say the arrest is for political reasons.

Early life
Peña Esclusa was born 3 July 1954 in Washington, D.C., the son of a Venezuelan Army General, Enrique Peña Briceño. He graduated in mechanical engineering from the Universidad Simón Bolívar in 1977, and in 1980 obtained a postgraduate degree in finance from the Instituto de Estudios Superiores de Administración (IESA). In 1978 he won the national karate championships, and in 1981 gained a civil aviation licence. He married Indira Ramírez in 1989, and had three daughters.

Political career

Early years
Peña Esclusa dates his political awakening to 1984, when he investigated the beliefs of various political parties with the aim of joining one, but found none satisfactory. In 1985 he helped distribute Lyndon LaRouche's book Narcotráfico, S.A. ("Dope, Inc."), and by 1988 he was the leader of the Partido Laboral Venezolano (PLV, Venezuelan Labor Party), a party which he co-founded as the Venezuelan branch of LaRouche's International Caucus of Labor Committees, modelled on LaRouche's U.S. Labor Party. He split with LaRouche in spring 1998, describing him as a "LaRouche movement deserter" in 2009. Peña Esclusa himself dates the split to 1995. In 1997 the Stephen Roth Institute wrote that "Anti-Semitic propaganda is also disseminated by the Partido Laboral Venezolano (Venezuela Workers' Party), an affiliate of the Lyndon LaRouche cult."

Opposition to Chávez
According to his wife, Alejandro Peña Esclusa has been an opponent of Hugo Chávez ever since he denounced Chávez for being a front man for Fidel Castro in a 1994 book. He published an article in 1995 attacking the Foro de São Paulo, which Chávez' Fifth Republic Movement joined that year.  Peña Esclusa entered the 1998 Venezuelan presidential election as a candidate for the Partido Laboral Venezolano (PLV), and was also a candidate on another occasion. Announcing his candidacy in July 1998, with Chavez already the front runner, he aimed to denounce Chavez and warn of the dangers of electing him. On 28 July 2000 Peña Esclusa formally accused Chávez of treason, denouncing him to the Attorney General, which rejected the claim.

In May 2001 Peña Esclusa founded the NGO Fuerza Solidaria. This organization coined the slogan "no to cubanization", and organised a range of political protests against Chávez, including a demonstration in front of the Cuban embassy. In February 2002 Peña Esclusa, on behalf of Fuerza Solidaria, called for the general strike being organised to be indefinite, until Chávez resigned. Following the mass demonstration of April 11, 2002, and the 2002 Venezuelan coup d'état attempt that resulted, he was briefly detained on suspicion of links to military officers allegedly involved. According to the Latin American Weekly Report, Esclusa was arrested and questioned for the 17 September 2002 publication of newspaper advertisements, sponsored by Fuerza Solidaria, urging the armed forces to "'restore constitutional order'" in the country by deposing President Chavez. Peña Esclusa himself has expressly denounced violence as a method, and said that he does not believe that violence could end Hugo Chávez's government, but that a peaceful mass movement could.

Traveling North and South America as well as Europe, Peña Esclusa has claimed that Chávez was allowing Russia and Iran to use Venezuela as a base for strategic bombers, submarines, warships, and long range missiles capable of reaching the United States. He has also alleged crimes against humanity perpetrated by the regime, and links with terrorist groups.

UnoAmerica
In December 2008 Peña Esclusa co-founded UnoAmerica, becoming its President. UnoAmerica describes itself as "a confederation of NGOs" working to combat Latin American left parties connected to the Sao Paulo Forum, which it accuses of "introduc[ing] Marxist ideological models that divide our societies into factions based on class and race, promoting hate, violence and anarchy" and, in some cases, of "destroying democracy from within".

UnoAmerica was one of the few organizations that endorsed as constitutional the deposing of president Manuel Zelaya during 2009 Honduran coup d'état, which involved Zelaya being arrested by the military acting on orders by the Supreme Court, removed from office and expelled from the country, and replaced by the person the constitution indicated as his successor, in this case the Speaker of the House Roberto Micheletti, as interim president. Peña Esclusa endorsed as constitutional the deposing of Zelaya, and said that "Only a process similar to that of Honduras can rescue democracy and freedom in Venezuela". He also said that “Venezuelans ought to be inspired by the Honduran model, and strive for a change of government as soon as possible, through peaceful, democratic, and constitutional means--and not just electoral--to avoid a national tragedy".

In August 2009, Peña Esclusa formally accused Venezuela's president Hugo Chávez before the International Criminal Court of crimes against humanity for his support of Manuel Zelaya's attempt to hold a referendum on whether to hold a Constituting Constitutional Convention in Honduras, which sparked the 2009 Honduran constitutional crisis, and for threatening to invade the country to reinstall Zelaya after he was deposed on June 28, 2009.

In November 2009 he was decorated with the "José Cecilio del Valle" medal by President Micheletti. Others decorated on that occasion were Armando Valladares and Juan Dabdoub Giacoman, who also had expressed public support for Honduras.

Controversies
According to the website of the Venezuelan Ministry of Communications & Information, Peña Esclusa was the head of Tradición, Familia y Propiedad (TFP), a group banned in 1984 when plans were discovered to murder Pope John Paul II during a visit to Venezuela. Peña Esclusa denies any links with TFP.

In early July 2010, the Salvadoran Francisco Chávez Abarca was arrested in Venezuela. The Venezuelan authorities accused Peña Esclusa of being an accomplice in a plan to use violence to disrupt the 2010 parliamentary elections. In response Peña Esclusa posted a video online denying the accusations and said that he expected to be arrested within a day. That evening he was arrested in his home by the Bolivarian Intelligence Service (SEBIN), accused of possession of explosives. Peña Esclusa's wife declared that search officers planted explosives in the desk of the couple's eight-year-old daughter. His lawyer, Alfredo Romero, declared that the 13 members of the political police of violating his client's constitutional rights at the search and arrest by not allowing his lawyer to be present or to inspect the search order. Luis Cabrera, the presiding judge, ruled that the presence of the lawyer could lead to impunity, to which Romero commented, "This court has declared dead the right to defense in Venezuela."

Peña Esclusa was denied bail on 15 July 2010. The preliminary hearings were held January 27, 2011, and on February 7 the defense appealed. The defense has consistently objected to the fact that the court has denied every request to order the presence of the star witness of the prosecutor for cross-examination, since Francisco Chávez Abarca was sent to Cuba just before Peña Esclusa's arrest in accordance with an Interpol red notice. FuerzaSolidaria published Peña Esclusa's petition in court, in which he accused the judge of acting politically, and the prosecutor of lying about statements allegedly made by Chávez Abarca.

On March 29, 2011, Indira de Peña Esclusa and other wives of prisoners of Chávez petitioned the Inter-American Commission on Human Rights that their husbands should be recognized as political prisoners by OAS.

Opposition deputy María Corina Machado has declared that he is a prisoner due to his opinions. Cardinal Jorge Urosa of the Catholic Church in Venezuela has repeatedly declared that he is certain that Peña Esclusa is innocent and demanded his release. In a letter dated 2011, nine senators from Bolivia wrote to Hugo Chávez and demanded that he release Alejandro Peña Esclusa, whom they describe as being imprisoned illegally in order to silence him, and that he the time he was imprisoned was heading a group of lawyers who were preparing a prosecution of Hugo Chávez for Crimes Against Humanity. 

Peña Esclusa was released from prison on 20 July 2011.

Books
 350: Cómo salvar a Venezuela del castro-comunismo, Caracas: Ediciones Fuerza Productiva, June 2005
 El Continente de la Esperanza, Caracas: Ediciones Fuerza Productiva, April 2006 (in English as The Continent of Hope, September 2006)
 El Foro de São Paulo contra Álvaro Uribe, April 2008 (in English as The Foro de São Paulo: A Threat to Freedom in Latin America, Bogotá: Mary Montes Edition, February 2009)

References

External links

 Fuerza Solidaria's website
 UnoAmerica's website

1954 births
Living people
Venezuelan politicians
Prisoners and detainees of Venezuela
Simón Bolívar University (Venezuela) alumni
People from Washington, D.C.
Venezuelan politicians convicted of crimes